"The Art of Architecture" is a British factual documentary series broadcast in the United Kingdom on Sky Arts. It aired a first series in 2019, a second in 2021, and a third in 2022, as well as two specials in 2020. Each of its episodes makes a study of a piece of new architecture or restoration, showing how they were inspired, designed and brought to fruition, with a profile of the architect or firm which created it. The Art of Architecture is directed and narrated by Alastair Layzell and the architectural consultant is Marcus Binney.

The title was previously used for a mini-series of three episodes in 1960 presented by Kenneth Clark, entitled The Good Old Rules, The Age of the Spaceman and The Architecture We Deserve.

Episodes

References

External links
 

2019 British television series debuts
2010s British documentary television series
2020s British documentary television series
Documentary television series about architecture
Documentary television series about art
Sky UK original programming
English-language television shows